P. J. Johnson (born June 14, 1996) is an American football nose tackle who is a free agent. He played college football at Arizona, and was drafted by the Detroit Lions in the seventh round of the 2019 NFL Draft. He has also been a member of the Los Angeles Chargers, Seattle Seahawks, Arizona Cardinals, Carolina Panthers, and Las Vegas Raiders.

High school career
Johnson attended Monterey Trail High School in Elk Grove, California, before transferring to Luther Burbank High School in Sacramento, California during his sophomore year. He played on both the offensive and defensive lines for the Titans, where he posted 90 tackles and six sacks as a senior, and was a two-time first-team all-Metro League selection. He also played baseball and basketball in high school.

College career
Johnson began his collegiate career at Sacramento State, where he was redshirted during the 2014 season, after suffering from a burst appendix. During the 2015 season, he appeared in all 11 games for the Hornets on the defensive line, and posted 13 tackles, including 4.5 tackles-for-loss, a sack and a forced fumble.

Johnson missed the 2016 season after suffering a leg injury on September 17, 2016. Tests revealed a tumor in Johnson's right leg, which he had removed in January 2017. Johnson transferred to City College of San Francisco during the 2017 season, where he played in 10 games and posted 17 tackles, 8.5 tackles-for-loss, 4.5 sacks and a forced fumble.

After leaving the San Francisco, Johnson received offers from Coastal Carolina, Florida Atlantic, Kansas, Massachusetts, New Mexico, Rutgers, Southeastern Louisiana and UNLV. In December 2017, Johnson announced he would sign with Arizona. During the 2018 season, Johnson appeared in 10 games for the Wildcats, including nine starts, where he posted 31 tackles, 8.5 tackles-for-loss, 3.0 sacks, one pass breakup, a forced fumble, two fumble recoveries and a safety. Following the season, he was named a Pac-12 All-Conference honorable mention. In January 2019, Johnson declared for the NFL Draft.

Professional career

Detroit Lions
Johnson was drafted by the Detroit Lions in the seventh round (229th overall) of the 2019 NFL Draft. He was waived on August 31, 2019.

Los Angeles Chargers
On December 4, 2019, Johnson was signed to the Los Angeles Chargers practice squad. He signed a futures contract with the Chargers on December 30, 2019. He was waived on August 1, 2020.

Seattle Seahawks
Johnson signed with the Seattle Seahawks on August 18, 2020. He was waived on September 5, 2020.

Arizona Cardinals
On November 24, 2020, Johnson was signed to the Arizona Cardinals' practice squad. On December 22, 2020, Johnson was released.

Carolina Panthers
Johnson signed with the Carolina Panthers on April 13, 2021. He was waived on May 16.

Detroit Lions (second stint)
On August 7, 2021, Johnson signed with the Detroit Lions. He was waived on August 23, 2021.

Las Vegas Raiders
On November 17, 2021, Johnson was signed to the Las Vegas Raiders practice squad. After the Raiders were eliminated in the 2021 Wild Card round of the playoffs, he signed a reserve/future contract on January 17, 2022. He was released on March 25, 2022.

Personal life
Johnson has three children, a son, Tolu, and two daughters, Kiara and Brooklynn.

References

1996 births
Living people
Arizona Cardinals players
Arizona Wildcats football players
Carolina Panthers players
City College of San Francisco Rams football players
Detroit Lions players
Las Vegas Raiders players
Los Angeles Chargers players
Players of American football from Sacramento, California
Sacramento State Hornets football players
Seattle Seahawks players